Berghuis is a Dutch habitational surname standing for a person from Berghuizen. The surname may refer to the following notable people:
Bell Berghuis (born 1985), Dutch snowboarder
Frank Berghuis (born 1967), Dutch football winger
Jaap Berghuis (1945–2005), Dutch artist
Steven Berghuis (born 1991), Dutch football winger
Thomas Berghuis (born 1973), Dutch art historian

See also
Berghuis v. Thompkins, a 2010 decision by the United States Supreme Court

References

Dutch-language surnames